K23LB-D, virtual and UHF digital channel 23, branded on-air as Informed TV, was a low-powered independent television station licensed to Fargo, North Dakota, United States. The station was owned by Frank Digital Broadcasting. The station's transmitter was located along 156th Avenue along the Rush River near Amenia.

The station filed for authority to go silent on October 8, 2017. It never returned to the air.

References

External links
Station website

 

Low-power television stations in the United States
Independent television stations in the United States
Television channels and stations established in 2011
23LB-D
Television channels and stations disestablished in 2017